MSER may refer to
 Maximally stable extremal regions, a method of blob detection in images
Materials Science and Engineering R: Reports, a journal in materials science